The Hamburgische Münze is a European coin mint located in the city of Hamburg. It is one of the four German coin mints, the others being the Staatliche Münzen Baden-Württemberg, the Bavarian State Mint, and the Staatliche Münze Berlin.

The earliest coins minted by the Hamburgische Münze are dated 834 CE, making it the oldest mint in Germany currently in operation. Since 1875 CE, all coins minted at the Hamburgische Münze have had a 'J' mint mark stamped on them for tracing purposes.

See also
Staatliche Münzen Baden-Württemberg
Bavarian Central Mint
Staatliche Münze Berlin
Euro
Coin mint
Hamburg

References

External links
 Official website (German)
 former Official website (English)

Mints of Germany
Economy of Hamburg